The World Figure Skating Championships is an annual figure skating competition sanctioned by the International Skating Union in which figure skaters compete for the title of World Champion.

Men's competitions took place from February 5th to 6th in Davos, Switzerland. Ladies' competitions took place from February 19th to 20th in Oslo, Norway. Pairs' competitions took place from February 22nd to 23rd in Vienna, Austria.

Results

Men

Judges:
 Kurt Dannenberg 
 Eduard Engelmann jr. 
 Josef Fellner 
 Fritz Kachler 
 J. G. Künzli 
 T. D. Richardson 
 Artur Vieregg

Ladies
Szabo retired after she was defeated by Sonja Henie of Norway. This result was controversial because the judging panel consisted of three Norwegians, a German, and an Austrian. The three Norwegian judges placed Henie first, while the German and Austrian judges placed Szabo first.

Judges:
 Arne Christiansen 
 O. R. Kolderup 
 Knut Oeren Meinich 
 Walter Müller 
 Artur Vieregg

Pairs

Judges:
 Walter Jakobsson 
 Otto Maly 
 Walter Müller 
 Max Rendschmidt 
 K. Scheibner

References

Sources
 Result List provided by the ISU

World Figure Skating Championships
World Figure Skating Championships
World Figure Skating Championships
World Figure Skating Championships
World Figure Skating Championships
International figure skating competitions hosted by Austria
International figure skating competitions hosted by Norway
International figure skating competitions hosted by Switzerland
Sport in Davos
1927 in Norwegian sport
1927 in Swiss sport
1927 in Austrian sport
1920s in Vienna
1920s in Oslo
International sports competitions in Oslo
Sports competitions in Vienna
February 1927 sports events